Kaunas Synagogue is one of two operating choral synagogues in Lithuania.  It is located in Centras eldership, Kaunas. The Neo-Baroque synagogue was built in 1872. In 1902, before the Holocaust in Lithuania, it was one of over 25 synagogues and Jewish prayer houses in the city. The radically designed synagogue claims to have one of the most beautiful arks in the entire Jewish world.

The plot for the new synagogue was bestowed to the Kovno Jewish community by the merchant Lewin Boruch Minkowski, the father of Oskar Minkowski and Hermann Minkowski; until 1873 he also subsidized the major part of its construction. A memorial to the estimated 50,000 Lithuanian Jewish children killed during the Holocaust can be found at the rear of the building, complete with 37 stone tablets showing in which towns and cities they lost their lives and just how many of them died in each one.

On 20 April 2011, the anniversary of Hitler's birthday, a sign saying "Jews out" and "Hitler was right" ("Juden raus" "Hitleris buvo teisus") were hung in front of the synagogue.

Gallery

References

External links

 Virtual panorama of the synagogue

21st-century attacks on synagogues and Jewish communal organizations
Buildings and structures in Kaunas
History of Kaunas
Jews and Judaism in Kaunas
Landmarks in Kaunas
Synagogues completed in 1872
Synagogues in Lithuania
Orthodox synagogues
Orthodox Judaism in Lithuania